Chênehutte-Trèves-Cunault is a former commune in the Maine-et-Loire department of western France. On 1 January 2016, it was merged into the new commune of Gennes-Val-de-Loire. It was created by the merger of the town of Chênehutte-les-Tuffeaux with the town of Trèves-Cunault in 1973.

See also
Communes of the Maine-et-Loire department

References

Chenehuttetrevescunault
Andes (Andecavi)